Tom Cosgrove (1930 – March 28, 2017) was a National Football League player for the Cleveland Browns and the Baltimore Colts. He played college football for the Maryland Terrapins at the University of Maryland.

College career
Cosgrove attended The University of Maryland where he played as a center under head coach Jim Tatum in 1951 and 1952. As a junior, in 1951, Cosgrove was named an honorable mention All-American. In 1952, Cosgrove was named a second-team All-American. He played in the 1952 Sugar Bowl at Tulane Stadium defeating Tennessee 28-13, 1953 North-South Shrine Game, the Senior Bowl, and the College All-Star Game.

In 1952, he was honored with the Coaches' Award for the team's most outstanding offensive lineman.

Professional career
Cosgrove was selected by the Cleveland Browns in the sixth round (156th overall) of the 1952 NFL Draft. In 1954 he was traded to Baltimore for their sixth round draft selection. He spent two years with the Colts before an ankle injury ended his career.

After the end of his playing career Cosgrove became a commercial airline pilot. He flew for Capital Airlines and then for United Airlinesafter the two merged. Cosgrove retired in 1990 to Potomac, Maryland. In 2005, he was inducted into the University of Maryland Athletics Hall of Fame.

Personal life
Cosgrove married Marguerite Wilson, with whom he has 8 children. He has 29 grandchildren, and 3 great-grand children.

Interred at Arlington National Cemetery Section 30, Site 841-RH

References

Players of American football from Philadelphia
Maryland Terrapins football players
American football centers
Cleveland Browns players
Baltimore Colts players
Commercial aviators
1930 births
2017 deaths
Date of birth missing